Prof. Christopher A. Rollston (born in Michigan, United States) is a scholar of the ancient Near East, specializing in Hebrew Bible, Greek New Testament, Old Testament Apocrypha, Northwest Semitic literature, epigraphy and paleography.

Biography
Rollston holds an MA and Ph.D. from Johns Hopkins University Department of Near Eastern Studies. He also holds an MAR from Emmanuel School of Religion (now known as Emmanuel Christian Seminary), and an undergraduate degree from Great Lakes Christian College.  Rollston is a member of the Phi Beta Kappa Society. He is Professor of Northwest Semitic Languages and Literatures at George Washington University and is chair of the department of Classical and Near Eastern Languages and Civilizations there.  He has been a National Endowment for the Humanities Research Scholar at the Albright Institute of Archaeological Research in Jerusalem (Fall 2013) and also at the American Center of Oriental Research in Amman (Summer 2002). He was a Visiting Professor of Northwest Semitic Literature at Tel Aviv University, Department of Archaeology in Spring 2014.  Recently, the Chronicle of Higher Education did a profile story about Rollston’s research and writing.

His primary research interests include the Hebrew Bible in its ancient cultural contexts, Northwest Semitic epigraphy and paleography, ancient writing practices, scribes and scribal education, literacy in the ancient world, origins and early use of the alphabet, ancient and modern epigraphic forgeries, inscribed ossuaries, personal names, prosopography, ancient religion, ancient wisdom literature, prophecy in the ancient Near Eastern and Mediterranean context, Septuagint, Dead Sea Scrolls. During recent years, his publications on the Qeiyafa Ostracon, the Tel Zayit Abecedary, and the Talpiyot (Jerusalem) Tombs have been considered particularly important.

Rollston's monograph entitled Writing and Literacy in Ancient Israel: Epigraphic Evidence from the Iron Age was published by the Society of Biblical Literature in October 2010.  The following year it was selected by the American Schools of Oriental Research for the prestigious "Frank Moore Cross Prize" as the most substantial volume in the field of Northwest Semitic Epigraphy.

Rollston has published articles in a number of refereed journals, including the Bulletin of the American Schools of Oriental Research, the Journal of Biblical Literature, Near Eastern Archaeology, Antiguo Oriente and Israel Exploration Journal.  He has also published in Biblical Archaeology Review, Archaeology, and HuffPost. In recent years he has served as an epigraphic consultant for the National Geographic Society and he also testified in the forgery trial in Jerusalem at the behest of the prosecution.

In addition to the National Endowment for the Humanities, Rollston's research has been funded by various agencies and organizations, including the National Endowment for the Humanities, the Society of Biblical Literature, and the American Schools of Oriental Research.  Moreover, he has excavated in Syria and in Israel and has conducted research at museums and departments of antiquity in Lebanon, Israel, Jordan, and Syria, and at various museums in the United States and Europe. He has lectured and delivered invited papers in a number of venues, including Hebrew University (Jerusalem), Al-Quds University (Jerusalem), Vanderbilt University, George Washington University, the University of Michigan, Brown University, Duke University, Tel Aviv University, Baylor University and the University of Wisconsin.

Rollston is active in the American Schools of Oriental Research and the Society of Biblical Literature (and has chaired and co-chaired epigraphic sessions for the annual meetings of both).  He served for several years on the Governing Board of the American Schools of Oriental Research, and has also served on the Editorial Board of the Bulletin of the American Schools of Oriental Research and currently serves as the co-editor of this journal (with Eric H. Cline). He has been the editor of the journal MAARAV for more than a decade.  In addition, he served on a regular basis on Reaffirmation Committees (on-site and off-site) for the Southern Association of Colleges and Schools.

In Fall 2018, Rollston was initiated as an honorary member of the Alpha Chapter of Delta Iota Gamma Fraternity, the world's first archaeology fraternity.

Bibliography

Books
 Enemies and Friends of the State: Ancient Prophecy in Context, Christopher A. Rollston (as editor and contributor). Penn State University Press, an Eisenbrauns imprint, 2018.
 Forging History in the Biblical World: Textual Forgeries from the Ancient and Modern Middle East, Medieval Europe, and the New World.  Forthcoming
 Writing and Literacy in the World of Ancient Israel: Epigraphic Evidence from the Iron Age (SBL Archaeology and Biblical Studies, 2010).
 The Gospels According to Michael Goulder: A North American Response (as editor). Trinity Press International, 2002.

Articles
"Ad Nomen Argumenta: Personal Names as Pejorative Puns in Ancient Times" pp. 367–386 in In the Shadow of Bezalel: Aramaic, Biblical, and Ancient Near EasternStudies in Honor of Bezalel Porten. Edited by Alejandro F. Botta. Leiden: E.J.Brill, 2013.

"Epigraphic Notes on the Ossuary of Mariam, Daughter of Yeshua': Limning the Broader Tableau" Israel Exploration Journal 62 (2012): 233-243.

“An Old Hebrew Stone Inscription from the City of David: A Trained Hand and a Remedial Hand on the Same Inscription.”  pp. 189–196 in Puzzling Out the Past: Studies in Northwest Semitic Languages and Literatures in Honor of Bruce Zuckerman, Eds, Marilyn J. Lundberg, Steven Fine, Wayne T. Pitard.  Leiden: Brill, 2012.

“What’s the Oldest Hebrew Inscription?”  Biblical Archaeology Review 38 (May–June 2012): 32-40, 66-68.

“Biblical Geography in Southwestern Judah,” by James W. Hardin, Christopher Rollston, Jeffrey A. Blakely.  Near Eastern Archaeology 75 (2012): 20-35.

“An Ancient Medium in the Modern Media: Sagas of Semitic Inscriptions.”  Duke University Conference, eds. Carol Meyers and Eric Meyers.  Winona Lake: Eisenbrauns, 2012.

“Edomite Inscriptions in 21st Century Perspective.”  In New Insights into the Iron Age Archaeology of Edom, Southern Jordan: Surveys, Excavations and Research from the Edom Lowland Regional Survey Project.  AASOR 2011, eds. T. E. Levy, M. Najjar, and E. Ben-Yosef.  American Schools of Oriental Research, 2012.

“Writing: Manuscripts and Codices”; “Writing: Writing Materials”; “Writing: Cuneiform”; “Writing: Alphabetic Script.”  In Oxford Companion to Archaeology, 2nd edition.  Oxford, 2012.

"An Old Hebrew Stone Inscription from the City of David: A trained Hand and a remedial Hand on the Same Inscription,” pp. 189–96 in Puzzling Out the Past: Studies in Northwest Semitic Languages and Literatures in Honor of Bruce Zuckerman (Leiden, Brill: 2012).

“The Khirbet Qeiyafa Ostracon: Methodological Musings and Caveats,” Tel Aviv 38 (2011) 67-82.

“A Fragmentary Cuneiform Tablet from the Ophel (Jerusalem): Methodological Musings about the Proposed Genre and Sitz im Leben.”  Antiguo Oriente 8 (2010): 11-21.

“Prosopography and the Yzbl Seal,” Israel Exploration Journal 59 (2009) 86-91.

“1 and 2 Kings: A Commentary.”  Pages 315-358 in The Transforming Word.  Co-author with Heather Dana Davis Parker.  Abilene Christian University Press, 2009.

“Heshbon A4 (= Heshbon II): A New Reading of a Personal Name.”   Bulletin of the American Schools of Oriental Research 350 (2008): 87-90.

“The Phoenician Script of the Tel Zayit Abecedary and Putative Evidence for Israelite Literacy.”  pp 61–96 in Literate Culture and Tenth-Century Canaan: The Tel Zayit Abecedary in Context, eds. Ronald Tappy and P. Kyle McCarter Jr.  Winona Lake: Eisenbrauns, 2008.  This volume won the “American Schools of Oriental Research 2009 Frank Moore Cross Prize for Epigraphy.” Rollston’s essay was the longest epigraphic article in the volume.“The Dating of the Early Royal Byblian Phoenician Inscriptions: A Response to Benjamin Sass.”  MAARAV 15 (2008): 57-93.

Review Article of The Religions of Ancient Israel: A Synthesis of Parallactic Approaches, by Ziony Zevit.  London: Continuum, 2001.  Bulletin of the American Schools of Oriental Research 348 (2007): 97-100.New Interpreter's Dictionary of the Bible, ed.  Abingdon.  Articles: (1) Tel Dan Inscription; (2) Inscriptions; (3) Mesad Hashavyahu; (4) Khirbet Meshash; (5) Onomastica; (6) Papyrus; (7) Khirbet Qeiyafa; (8) Seals and Scarabs; (9) Tablet; (10) Writing and Writing Materials; (11) Writing Boards; (12) Writing Case; (13) Ya’udi; (14) Tav.

“Epigraphic West Semitic Scripts.”  In International Encyclopedia of Language and Linguistics, 2nd Edition, ed., Keith Brown.  Elsevier: Oxford.  2006.

“Scribal Education in Ancient Israel: The Old Hebrew Epigraphic Evidence.”  Bulletin of the American Schools of Oriental Research 344 (2006): 47-74.

“Epigraphic Essays: An Introduction.”  Bulletin of the American Schools of Oriental Research 344 (2006): 1-3.

“Inscribed Ossuaries: Personal Names, Statistics, and Laboratory Tests.”  Near Eastern Archaeology 69 (2006): 125-129.

“Navigating the Epigraphic Storm: A Palaeographer Reflects on Inscriptions from the Market.”  Near Eastern Archaeology 68 (2005): 69-72.

“The Antiquities Market, Sensationalized Textual Data, and Modern Forgeries.”  Written with Andrew Vaughn.  Near Eastern Archaeology 68 (2005): 61-69.

“The Public Display of Forgeries: A Desideratum for Museums and Collections.”  Written with Heather Dana Davis Parker.  Near Eastern Archaeology 68 (2005): 75.

“Non-Provenanced Epigraphs II: The Status of Non-Provenanced Epigraphs within the Broader Corpus of Northwest Semitic.”  MAARAV 11 (2004): 57-79.

“Non-Provenanced Epigraphs I: Pillaged Antiquities, Northwest Semitic Forgeries, and Protocols for Laboratory Tests.”  MAARAV 10 (2003): 135-193..

“The Rise of Monotheism in Ancient Israel: Biblical and Epigraphic Evidence.”  Stone-Campbell Journal 6 (2003): 95-115.

“Ben Sira (Ecclesiasticus) 38:24-39:11 and the Egyptian Satire of the Trades: A Reconsideration.” Journal of Biblical Literature 120 (2001): 131-139.

“Laboratory Analysis of the Moussaieff Ostraca using a Scanning Electron Microscope (SEM) with an Energy Dispersive X-Ray Microanalyzer (EDS).” Near Eastern Archaeology'' 61 (1998): 8-9.

References

External links 
 GW dept. web profile
 Personal website
 On Academia.edu
 Rollston in Huffington Post
 World’s Leading Near East Epigrapher Returns to GW
 Chronicle.com Profile
 BASOR Editors
 Polemic situation regarding Rollston's statements on women in the Bible

Philologists
Living people
Year of birth missing (living people)
Johns Hopkins University alumni